Shedeur Sanders (born February 7, 2002) is an American football quarterback who currently plays for the Colorado Buffaloes. He previously played at Jackson State. Sanders is the son of Pro Football Hall of Fame cornerback and University of Colorado head coach Deion Sanders.

Early life and high school
Sanders attended Trinity Christian School in Cedar Hill, Texas, where his father was the school's offensive coordinator. As a senior, he completed 251-of-366 pass attempts for 3,702 yards and 43 touchdowns. Sanders was rated a four-star prospect and initially committed to play college football at Florida Atlantic over offers from Florida State, Florida, Georgia, and Alabama. Sanders flipped his commitment to Jackson State after his father was named the Tigers' head coach.

College career

Jackson State
Sanders enrolled at Jackson State in January 2021, but was ineligible to play for the team in its Spring 2021 season, which was abbreviated and delayed from its normally intended fall 2020 schedule due to COVID-19. Sanders was named the Tigers' starting quarterback going into the 2021 fall season and passed for 3,231 yards with 30 touchdowns and eight interceptions. He was named the Southwestern Athletic Conference (SWAC) Freshman of the Year and second team All-SWAC and won the Jerry Rice Award as the most outstanding freshman in the NCAA Division I Football Championship Subdivision, becoming the first player from a Historically Black college or university (HBCU) to win the award.

To open his sophomore season, Sanders completed 29 of 33 passes for 323 yards and five touchdowns in the Tigers' 59–3 win over Florida A&M. He completed 70.6% of his pass attempts for 3,732 yards with 40 touchdowns and six interceptions as a sophomore and was named the SWAC Offensive Player of the Year. Sanders entered the NCAA transfer portal after the 2022 Celebration Bowl.

Colorado
On December 21, 2022, Sanders joined his father and transferred to the University of Colorado Boulder.

Statistics

Personal life
Sanders' older brother, Shilo, played football at South Carolina before transferring to Jackson State prior to the 2021 season.

Sanders signed a Name, Image and Likeness (NIL) deal with Gatorade on January 27, 2022, becoming the first player from an HBCU to do so. Sanders also has NIL agreements with Beats by Dre and BRADY, an apparel company founded by former NFL quarterback, Tom Brady.

Sanders is currently dating Storm Reid, one of the stars of the TV series Euphoria.

References

External links
 Jackson State profile

2002 births
Living people
American football quarterbacks
Jackson State Tigers football players
People from Cedar Hill, Texas
Sportspeople from Tyler, Texas
Players of American football from Texas
African-American players of American football
21st-century African-American sportspeople